Oidaematophorus iwatensis is a moth of the family Pterophoridae that is known from Japan (Honshu), Korea and China.

Taxonomy
It was formerly listed as a synonym of Oidaematophorus lithodactylus.

References

External links
Taxonomic And Biological Studies Of Pterophoridae Of Japan (Lepidoptera)
Japanese Moths

Oidaematophorini
Moths described in 1931
Moths of Asia
Moths of Korea
Moths of Japan
Taxa named by Shōnen Matsumura